Two ships of the Royal Navy have borne the name HMS Tenby, after the Pembrokeshire seaside town of Tenby:

  was a  launched in 1941 and sold in 1948.
  was a  launched in 1955. She was sold to the Pakistan Navy in 1975 but was not taken up and was sold for scrapping in 1977.

Royal Navy ship names